"Resurrection (Paper, Paper)" is a 2000 rap single by Bone Thugs-n-Harmony, the first single released from their album BTNHResurrection.

Background
The single was to represent what Bone Thugs were doing at the time. There was a lot of speculation that Bizzy Bone was leaving the group and people wanted to know where the band stood. Flesh-n-Bone was featured on the CD version of the song, but did not appear in the video. Even though the single did not perform well on the charts, the song is considered somewhat of a classic by Bone fans because of its well-directed video and memorable instrumentation and lyrics. This is the first of three times that Flesh-n-Bone was featured in a CD version of a song, but not featured in a video. The others were "Can't Give It Up" and "Change the World". However, when the song stops and the group says "Flesh, Flesh we in the Flesh" a view from him rapping in the "East 1999" music video plays behind them.

Charts

2000 singles
Bone Thugs-n-Harmony songs
2000 songs
Ruthless Records singles
Song articles with missing songwriters